The Coomsaharn char (Salvelinus fimbriatus; the spellings Coomasaharn and charr are also used) is a species of lacustrine char fish in the family Salmonidae.

It is only located in Lough Coomsaharn, County Kerry, Ireland.

Taxonomy

Name

The English word "char[r]" is thought to derive from Old Irish ceara/cera meaning "[blood] red," referring to its pink-red underside. This would also connect with its Welsh name torgoch, "red belly."

Lough Coomsaharn derives its name from the Irish Com Sathairn, "hollow of Saturday(?)".

Biology

Salvelinus fimbriatus spawns in November/December and feeds on zooplankton. It is distinguished from other Salvelinus in Ireland by large eyes, having 27–30 gill rakers, with 16–20 on the lower part (hence the species name fimbriatus, "fringed"). Also, its body depth is 20–25% of snout length, the snout is conical, and the lower jaw is not included in the upper one; an adaptation that helps it to feed on plankton.

History

The Coomsaharn char are a remnant fish of the Last Ice Age.

References 

fimbriatus
Endemic freshwater fish of Ireland 
Salvelinus fimbriatus